Agdistis rubasiensis is a moth of the family Pterophoridae. It is found in Russia (including the Caucasus and Dagestan), as well as Azerbaijan. In Azerbaijan, it is found in saline habitats.

References

Moths described in 1985
Agdistinae